Shear Madness is an interactive whodunit play, and is one of the longest-running nonmusical plays in the world. On January 29, 2020, the Boston cast celebrated its 40th anniversary (the show's 12,580th performance) at The Charles Playhouse Stage II. The show's Boston instantiation closed on March 15, 2020.

Plot
The play is set in a unisex hair salon in the city in which it plays. The landlady, Isabel Czerny, who lives above the shop is murdered and the audience gets involved in the action by questioning the actors and attempting to solve the crime. The characters include a flamboyant hairdresser and their flirty yet ditzy assistant, along with a prim and proper uptight older lady, and an older man who is a "used antique dealer". Much of the dialogue is improvised by the actors, and the humor tends to revolve around topical references to current events.

The ending of the play is different every night as audience members hear clues, question the characters, and then vote on who they think is guilty. Whoever the audience votes to be the murderer, that person improvises dialogue along with the rest of the cast to reveal themselves.

Performance history

Shear Madness opened in Boston at the Charles Playhouse Stage II in January 1980. A second production, at the John F. Kennedy Center for the Performing Arts's Theater Lab in Washington D.C., opened in August 1987. A third production opened in November 2015 at the New World Stages Off-Broadway theater in New York City.  The Boston production is sometimes described as the longest-running or second-longest-running non-musical play in the world, although various non-musical plays have run for longer: Agatha Christie's The Mousetrap in London since 1952, Eugène Ionesco's The Bald Soprano in Paris since 1957, and Israel Horovitz's Line in New York City (1974-2018). A Turkish adaptation by director Nedim Saban opened in Istanbul in 1998. In 2003 Saban adapted the play for a second time; he introduced SMS messages and online chatting as means of interaction. A French adaptation by director Sébastien Azzopardi, written by Azzopardi and Sacha Danino, opened in Paris in 2011. A Catalan adaptation by director Pere Planella, written by Guillem-Jordi Graells, opened in 1987 in Barcelona; a Spanish translation by Nacho Artime, opened in 1989 in Madrid. A Spanish adaptation by director Rina Rajlevsky, written by Alberto Lomnitz and Ricardo Esquerra, opened in 2017 in Mexico City.

Performance locations

References

External sources
 
 New York Times review

1980 plays
German plays